Arcot Ramasamy Lakshmanaswami Mudhaliyar Matriculation Higher Secondary School, known as ARLM Matriculation Higher Secondary School (ஏ.ஆர்.எல்.எம். மெட்ரிகுலேசன் ஹையர் செகண்டரி ஸ்கூல்) is a school in Cuddalore, Tamil Nadu, India. It was founded by, and named after, the twins Arcot Ramasamy Mudaliar and A. Lakshmanaswami Mudaliar.

Correspondent
Andal Damodaran, a child welfare activist who has served as president of the Indian Council of Child Welfare, serves as the correspondent of the institution. Prior to her, A.R. Damodaran, son of A. Ramaswami Mudaliar, served as the correspondent of the school and as the President of the ARMES trust since its inception, until his death on 25 August 2019.

Notable alumni
 R. Radhakrishnan (politician), former Member of Parliament
 Desingh Periyasamy, film director
 Karthik Mohan Kumar, professional boxer

References

Primary schools in Tamil Nadu
High schools and secondary schools in Tamil Nadu
Education in Cuddalore district
Educational institutions established in 1981
1981 establishments in Tamil Nadu